Alex the Dog was the advertising mascot for Stroh's beer in the 1980s and precursor to Budweiser's Spuds MacKenzie. At the peak of his career, Alex appeared in parades, on Good Morning America, and the Today show. He even inspired a series of toys, posters, cologne, shampoo and hand lotion. Hip-hop artist Tone Loc referenced Alex the Dog in his song "Funky Cold Medina".

Commercials
Peter Blum, the archivist for Stroh's, describes Alex's most famous commercial:

Background
The dog who portrayed Alex was Banjo, who was part Golden Retriever and Irish Setter.  He was found by a trainer at an animal shelter. Alex served as the Stroh's dog from around 1984 until 1989 when the creators of the Alex the Dog commercials, Lowe Marschalk (Seth Werner, copywriter; Gary Ennis, art director; and Paul T Norwich, account supervisor), lost the contract with Stroh's.  Comedian Brian Regan served as Alex's campaign manager during Alex's Presidential campaign.  Banjo died of cancer a few years after the advertising campaign ended.

See also
 List of individual dogs

References

American television commercials
1980s television commercials
Advertising campaigns
Beer advertising
Individual dogs in the United States
Dog mascots
Drink advertising characters
Male characters in advertising